The 1994 Chicago Cubs season was the 123rd season of the Chicago Cubs franchise, the 119th in the National League and the 79th at Wrigley Field. The Cubs finished the shortened season fifth and last in the National League Central with a record of 49–64.

One of the highlights of the season was Karl "Tuffy" Rhodes hitting three home runs on Opening Day - all off Dwight Gooden of the New York Mets. The Cubs still lost the game 12-8.  Rhodes would only hit five more homers that season and the Cubs would set a record by losing their first 12 home games.

Offseason
 October 12, 1993: Steve Lake was released by the Chicago Cubs.
 November 24, 1993: Glenallen Hill signed as a free agent with the Chicago Cubs.
 December 14, 1993: Mike Maksudian was signed as a free agent with the Chicago Cubs.
 January 24, 1994: Dave Otto was signed as a free agent with the Chicago Cubs.
 March 30, 1994: Anthony  Young was traded by the New York Mets with Ottis Smith (minors) to the Chicago Cubs for José Vizcaíno.

Regular season

The Cubs finished the strike-shortened season with a 49-64 record.  They scored 500 runs (4.42 per game) and allowed 549 runs (4.86 per game).

One of the most-memorable moments in Cubs history occurred April 29. 1994, after a heart-breaking 6-5 loss to the Colorado Rockies at Wrigley Field.  The Cubs loaded the bases with one out in the bottom of the ninth only to have Glenallen Hill swing at the first pitch he saw and ground into a game-ending double play. The loss was the ninth consecutive home defeat for the Cubs to start the season and dropped the club to 6-15.  Manager Tom Trebelhorn had vowed to meet fans outside the ballpark if the Cubs lost another home game and was true to his word, wading into a crowd of some 200 angry fans gathered at a fire station on Waveland Avenue just outside Wrigley's left-field wall. The confrontation started ugly, but within a half hour, Trebelhorn, who was known for his quick humor and good nature, won over most of his detractors.  The team went on to lose three more home games before snapping the record streak with a 5-2 win over the Cincinnati Reds on May 4, 1994, but by then Trebelhorn's "Firehouse Chat" was a memorable moment in Cubs' history. The season, which ended when Major League players went on 1994–95 Major League Baseball strike Aug 12, was Trebelhorn's only as manager of the Cubs. He was replaced in 1995 by Jim Riggleman.

Game log

|-
| 1 || April 4 || Mets
|-
| 2 || April 5 || Mets
|-
| 3 || April 6 || Mets
|-  style="text-align:center; background:#bfb;"
| 4 || April 8 || @ Expos || 4-0 || Trachsel (1-0) || Martínez (0-1) || || 47,001 || 1-3 || Boxscore
|-  style="text-align:center; background:#bfb;"
| 5 || April 9 || @ Expos || 4-3 || Plesac (1-0) || Wetteland (0-1) || Myers (1) || 38,635 || 2-3 || Boxscore
|-  style="text-align:center; background:#fbb;"
| 6 || April 10 || @ Expos || 2-8 || Hill (2-0) || Guzmán (0-2) || || 16,183 || 2-4 || Boxscore
|-
| 7 || April 11 || @ Mets
|-
| 8 || April 14 || @ Mets
|-
| 9 || April 15 || Braves
|-
| 10 || April 16 || Braves
|-
| 11 || April 17 || Braves
|-
| 12 || April 19 || Astros
|-
| 13 || April 20 || Astros
|-
| 14 || April 22 || @ Rockies
|-
| 15 || April 23 || @ Rockies
|-
| 16 || April 24 || @ Rockies
|-
| 17 || April 25 || @ Reds
|-
| 18 || April 26 || @ Reds
|-
| 19 || April 27 || @ Astros
|-
| 20 || April 28 || @ Astros
|-
| 21 || April 29 || Rockies
|-

|-
| 22 || May 1 || Rockies
|-
| 23 || May 2 || Reds
|-
| 24 || May 3 || Reds
|-
| 25 || May 4 || Reds
|-
| 26 || May 6 || @ Pirates
|-
| 27 || May 8 || @ Pirates
|-
| 28 || May 8 || @ Pirates
|-
| 29 || May 9 || @ Cardinals
|-
| 30 || May 10 || @ Cardinals
|-
| 31 || May 11 || @ Cardinals
|-
| 32 || May 12 || @ Cardinals
|-
| 33 || May 13 || Marlins
|-
| 34 || May 14 || Marlins
|-
| 35 || May 15 || Marlins
|-
| 36 || May 16 || Padres
|-
| 37 || May 17 || Padres
|-
| 38 || May 18 || Padres
|-
| 39 || May 20 || Giants
|-
| 40 || May 21 || Giants
|-
| 41 || May 22 || Giants
|-
| 42 || May 23 || @ Dodgers
|-
| 43 || May 24 || @ Dodgers
|-
| 44 || May 25 || @ Dodgers
|-
| 45 || May 27 || @ Braves
|-
| 46 || May 28 || @ Braves
|-
| 47 || May 29 || @ Braves
|-
| 48 || May 30 || Phillies
|-
| 49 || May 31 || Phillies
|-

|-
| 50 || June 1 || Phillies
|-
| 51 || June 2 || Phillies
|-  style="text-align:center; background:#fbb;"
| 52 || June 3 || Expos || 1-3 || Shaw (3-1) || Crim (2-1) || Wetteland (7) || 26,037 || 22-30 || Boxscore
|-  style="text-align:center; background:#fbb;"
| 53 || June 4 || Expos || 1-6 || Martínez (4-4) || Banks (6-5) || || 37,187 || 22-31 || Boxscore
|-  style="text-align:center; background:#fbb;"
| 54 || June 5 || Expos || 5-10 (13 inn.) || Heredia (1-2) || Otto (0-1) || || 34,181 || 22-32 || Boxscore
|-
| 55 || June 6 || @ Phillies
|-
| 56 || June 7 || @ Phillies
|-
| 57 || June 8 || @ Phillies
|-
| 58 || June 10 || Dodgers
|-
| 59 || June 11 || Dodgers
|-
| 60 || June 12 || Dodgers
|-
| 61 || June 14 || @ Padres
|-
| 62 || June 15 || @ Padres
|-
| 63 || June 16 || @ Padres
|-
| 64 || June 17 || @ Giants
|-
| 65 || June 18 || @ Giants
|-
| 66 || June 19 || @ Giants
|-
| 67 || June 21 || @ Marlins
|-
| 68 || June 23 || @ Marlins
|-
| 69 || June 24 || Cardinals
|-
| 70 || June 25 || Cardinals
|-
| 71 || June 26 || Cardinals
|-
| 72 || June 27 || Pirates
|-
| 73 || June 28 || Pirates
|-
| 74 || June 29 || Pirates
|-
| 75 || June 30 || @ Astros
|-

|-
| 76 || July 1 || @ Astros
|-
| 77 || July 2 || @ Astros
|-
| 78 || July 3 || @ Astros
|-
| 79 || July 4 || Rockies
|-
| 80 || July 4 || Rockies
|-
| 81 || July 5 || Rockies
|-
| 82 || July 6 || Rockies
|-
| 83 || July 7 || Astros
|-
| 84 || July 8 || Astros
|-
| 85 || July 9 || Astros
|-
| 86 || July 10 || Astros
|-
| 87 || July 14 || @ Reds
|-
| 88 || July 15 || @ Reds
|-
| 89 || July 16 || @ Reds
|-
| 90 || July 17 || @ Reds
|-
| 91 || July 18 || @ Rockies
|-
| 92 || July 19 || @ Rockies
|-
| 93 || July 20 || @ Rockies
|-
| 94 || July 22 || Reds
|-
| 95 || July 23 || Reds
|-
| 96 || July 24 || Reds
|-
| 97 || July 25 || @ Pirates
|-
| 98 || July 26 || @ Pirates
|-
| 99 || July 27 || @ Pirates
|-
| 100 || July 28 || @ Pirates
|-
| 101 || July 29 || @ Cardinals
|-
| 102 || July 30 || @ Cardinals
|-
| 103 || July 31 || @ Cardinals
|-

|-
| 104 || August 1 || Marlins
|-
| 105 || August 2 || Marlins
|-
| 106 || August 3 || Marlins
|-
| 107 || August 4 || Marlins
|-
| 108 || August 5 || Padres
|-
| 109 || August 6 || Padres
|-
| 110 || August 7 || Padres
|-
| 111 || August 8 || Giants
|-
| 112 || August 9 || Giants
|-
| 113 || August 10 || Giants
|-

Season standings

Record vs. opponents

Notable transactions
 May 16, 1994: Willie Wilson was released by the Chicago Cubs. 
 July 27, 1994: Mike Sharperson signed as a free agent with the Chicago Cubs.

Roster

Player stats

Batting

Starters by position
Note: Pos = Position; G = Games played; AB = At bats; H = Hits; Avg. = Batting average; HR = Home runs; RBI = Runs batted in

Other batters
Note: G = Games played; AB = At bats; H = Hits; Avg. = Batting average; HR = Home runs; RBI = Runs batted in

Pitching

Starting pitchers
Note: G = Games pitched; IP = Innings pitched; W = Wins; L = Losses; ERA = Earned run average; SO = Strikeouts

Other pitchers
Note: G = Games pitched; IP = Innings pitched; W = Wins; L = Losses; ERA = Earned run average; SO = Strikeouts

Relief pitchers
Note: G = Games pitched; W = Wins; L = Losses; SV = Saves; ERA = Earned run average; SO = Strikeouts

Farm system

Notes

References
1994 Chicago Cubs season at Baseball Reference

Chicago Cubs seasons
Chicago Cubs season
Cub